Tony A. Fairley is an American former basketball player. He formerly held the National Collegiate Athletic Association (NCAA) Division I record for recording the most assists in a single game with 22. He shares this record with Syracuse's Sherman Douglas, Southern's Avery Johnson, and Oklahoma's Trae Young. Fairley had his 22-assist game on February 9, 1987, against Armstrong State College. Incidentally, Fairley also recorded 10 steals in that game as well – one of two times when he grabbed 10 steals in a game, which are Charleston Southern University records. In 1986–87, his senior season at Charleston Southern, Fairley also led Division I in steals with a 4.07 per game average.

Fairley graduated in 1988 as the Big South Conference's all-time leader in both steals per game (3.68) and assists per game (7.58), each of which still stand atop the record books through the 2012–13 season.

The closest he ever got to playing in the National Basketball Association (NBA) after his college career was playing on the Miami Heat's training camp roster from May 1988 through October 1988.

See also
 List of NCAA Division I men's basketball season steals leaders
 List of NCAA Division I men's basketball players with 20 or more assists in a game

References

Living people
American men's basketball players
Basketball players from Miami
Charleston Southern Buccaneers men's basketball players
Miami Dade Sharks men's basketball players
Point guards
Year of birth missing (living people)